Dejan Nikolić (born 27 April 1969) is a Serbian football manager and former player.

Playing career
Nikolić started out with Sloboda Užice and played in the Yugoslav Second League for three seasons (1988–89, 1989–90, and 1990–91). He also spent some time at Napredak Kruševac (1993–94 and 1994–95) and Mladost Lučani (1995–96), before moving abroad to Belgian club Mouscron in 1996. After returning to his homeland, Nikolić played for Hajduk Beograd in their debut season in the top flight.

Managerial career
After hanging up his boots, Nikolić served as manager of numerous Serbian First League and Serbian League West clubs, including Mladost Lučani and Mačva Šabac. He was also manager of Budućnost Krušik 2014 and Kolubara on two occasions.

Honours
Mačva Šabac
 Serbian League West: 2013–14

References

External links
 
 
 

1969 births
Living people
People from Lučani
Yugoslav footballers
Serbia and Montenegro footballers
Serbian footballers
Association football midfielders
FK Sloboda Užice players
FK Napredak Kruševac players
FK Mladost Lučani players
R.E. Mouscron players
FK Hajduk Beograd players
Yugoslav Second League players
First League of Serbia and Montenegro players
Belgian Pro League players
Serbia and Montenegro expatriate footballers
Expatriate footballers in Belgium
Serbia and Montenegro expatriate sportspeople in Belgium
Serbian football managers
FK Mladost Lučani managers
FK Mačva Šabac managers
FK Kolubara managers
FK Radnički 1923 managers